Jade (Jennifer-Lynn Hayden) is a superhero in the . She first appeared in All-Star Squadron #25 in September 1983. She is the daughter of Alan Scott and Rose Canton and twin sister of Obsidian.

Jade appeared in the second and third season of Stargirl on The CW network, portrayed by Ysa Penarejo.

Background
Jade is the daughter of the first (Earth) Green Lantern, Alan Scott, and Rose Canton, a.k.a. the Thorn. Jade's twin brother is Todd Rice, a.k.a. Obsidian.

Jade is a founding member of Infinity, Inc. She has worked with the Justice League and the Justice Society of America. She is also a member and leader of the Outsiders. After being given a power ring (a spare one), she joined the Green Lantern Corps. The Green Lantern Corps had been resurrected and Jade was the first female Green Lantern from Earth.

Jade's romantic interests are Henry King and Kyle Rayner. She was ranked 34th in Comics Buyer's Guide's "100 Sexiest Women in Comics" list.

Fictional character biography

Rose, Jade's mother, was married, briefly, to Alan Scott. When she had children by Scott, she gave them up for adoption because she feared she would harm them. Jade and her twin brother were separated.

Jade was adopted by a couple living in the suburbs of Milwaukee. Jade learned of her twin brother Todd when she was in her late teens. Shortly after she met Todd, the two siblings tried to join the Justice Society. They were rejected but joined with other children and protégés of JSA members to form Infinity Inc.

Due to their father's exposure to magical energies, Jade and her brother were born with metahuman powers. Jade's powers first manifested when she was a child when she defended herself against sexual harassment. Jade's powers resembled her father's in that she was able to generate green energy and shape it into constructs. Jade also inherited her mother's power of plant manipulation.

Jade made a career in modeling in California then left to pursue photography in New York City. There, her roommate was Kyle Rayner. Jade and Kyle became romantically involved. When Jade lost her powers in a battle with Starheart, Kyle gave her a spare power ring and battery, thus making her a member of the Green Lantern Corps. Kyle later restored her powers during his first, short tenure as the god-like Ion. Jade's power ring eventually passed to John Stewart.

After Kyle's friend Terry Berg was attacked, Jade and Kyle left Earth. After completing a number of missions, Jade returned to Earth. She ended her relationship with Kyle after falling in love with another man. Jade then served as a member and leader of the Outsiders. Around this time, Jade assisted Donna Troy and some of the alumni of the Teen Titans in their battle against the Titans of Myth. Jade also assisted the Green Lantern Corps in Green Lantern: Rebirth to defeat and imprison the parasitic fear entity, Parallax. 

In the Rann-Thanagar War Infinite Crisis Special, Jade died while trying to prevent Alexander Luthor, Jr. from tearing the universe into a multiverse. Her consciousness and powers lingered until her Starheart powers merged with Kyle, awakening the Ion entity sleeping within him.

In the story arc "One Year Later", Alan Scott lay in a coma after an attack by the Gentleman Ghost. The original Jade appeared to him to say goodbye, granting him another portion of her green energy which replaced his eye that he had lost during the 2005–2006 Infinite Crisis storyline.

Blackest Night

During the 2009–2010 Blackest Night storyline, Jade's remains were reanimated as a member of the Black Lantern Corps. Jade, a soulless undead being, used Kyle's affection for her against him. She said his love for her had brought her back. However, Kyle recognized her lies after witnessing the attack of the Black Lantern Corps on the planet Oa. Kyle became enraged and tried to destroy the Black Lantern Corps. Jade captured Kyle and tormented him with black energy constructs of Alexandra DeWitt, Donna Troy, his mother (Moira Rayner), and herself. This was to remind Kyle of his failures to save the women who were important to him.

The battle between Jade and Kyle was ended by Soranik Natu, who activated Jade's ring. The Black Lanterns were then given a new directive: to devour Oa's Central Power Battery. Mogo caused all of the Black Lanterns, including Jade, to be pulled down to the planet Oa and absorbed into its core. There, super-hot magma continually burned up the Black Lanterns, preventing them from regenerating their forms.

Return
During the finale of Blackest Night, Jade and a few of the Black Lanterns are resurrected in their true forms. Jade and Kyle resumed their relationship. In adjusting to her new life, Jade acknowledges Cade, Kyle, Soranik and Deadman, now a White Lantern.

Later on, the Justice League found Jade unconscious, held within a green crystal meteor that had crashed in Germany. The green crystal meteor was the Starheart, the legendary crystal that gave Alan Scott his powers and therefore, Jade, her powers. After waking, Jade revealed that while on Oa, the Starheart had kidnapped her and brought her to Earth to locate her father. However, on learning that the Starheart had taken control of her father's body, she opted to help the Justice League to stop him.

Jade joined with the JLA and JSA to stop metahumans who were under the control of the Starheart. At the same time, Mr. Terrific searched for a way to weaken the Starheart's power. Jade used her father's old lantern to make a brief connection with her father. The insignia of the Black Lantern Corps was briefly shown, floating behind her. When Jade went to stop her father, she found Kyle, who had been sent by the Guardians of the Universe to kill her father.

An Entity of the White Lantern Corps instructed Jade to help her brother Obsidian "balance the darkness" and save their friends. When Jade tried to rescue Obsidian from the control of the Starheart, Jade and Obsidian were fused together. This fusion made an entity which was also controlled by the Starheart. Jade and Obsidian attacked the Justice League and the Justice Society, until Jade was again contacted by the White Light Entity. The White Light Entity separated Jade and Obsidian. Obsidian tried to make the fusion occur again, but Kyle restrained and removed him. Jade restored her father's Starheart and was reunited with him. As a result of her fusion with Obsidian, Jade was no longer able to be in close proximity to her brother without risking further threat from the Starheart. After this, Jade remained with the Justice League.

Following this, Eclipso reawakened and traveled to the Emerald City that Alan Scott established on the moon, stating that he now wished to capture Jade. After taking over Jade, Eclipso has the power of the Starheart and defeats and possesses the Justice League's reserve roster and then badly injures the angel Zauriel. With the Justice League outnumbered, Eclipso then reveals his ultimate goal is to somehow kill God. Eclipso then tortures Zauriel, causing his screams to attract the attention of the new Spectre, Crispus Allen, whom he kills, absorbing the Spectre's powers upon his demise. With his newfound abilities, Eclipso reveals that God relies on the collective love of humanity to stay alive and that by destroying Earth, Eclipso will ultimately kill God once and for all. Just as the members of the JLA prepare to wage a counterattack, Eclipso destroys the Moon, apparently dooming all life on Earth. With the Moon destroyed, Eclipso then seemingly kills Donna Troy, the physically strongest remaining member of the Justice League. It is ultimately revealed that Donna's death was an illusion conjured by Saint Walker, who used his blue power ring to temporarily trap Eclipso in a state of euphoria. After the Atom and Starman break Eclipso's link to his brainwashed slaves, the combined heroes attack Eclipso together, defeating him. In the aftermath, it is discovered that Jade and Obsidian can now be within proximity of each other again and their father has control of the Starheart.

After a battle with the villain D'arken and releasing the Starheart energies, Jade's father Alan Scott's body is incinerated. Afterward, there is a funeral for Alan, whom the JSA and Jade believe to be dead.

As part of the JLA, Jade played a major role in ending the Saturn-Thanagar War by channeling the Starheart's power to magnify the telepathic abilities of the new colonists of Titan to compel the Thanagaran fleet to leave.

Jade was removed from continuity with "The New 52" and "DC Rebirth". It was revealed later that this was because of Doctor Manhattan altering the timeline that prevented her father from becoming Green Lantern.

In the "Watchmen" sequel "Doomsday Clock", Jade is among the Justice Society of America members that returns after Doctor Manhattan undoes the experiment that erased the Justice Society of America and the Legion of Super-Heroes.

Following the reboot of the multiverse at the end of "Dark Nights: Death Metal", Alan Scott reunites with Jade and Obsidian at the Justice Society brownstone and comes out as gay.

Powers and abilities
Jade has Starheart energy manipulation powers similar to those of her father. However, unlike her father, her powers do not come from a ring or a lantern but are channeled through the star-shaped birthmark on her palm. As it is with all Green Lanterns, Jade can bring unlimited green energy constructs to life. She can use the constructs in any way, limited only by her will, imagination, and endurance. She uses the constructs most often to create shields, to fly, to travel through outer space and to run very quickly. Jade's power often manifests as green fire. Jade is unable to affect any object made of wood.

Jade inherited from her mother the ability to affect plants. Jade can cause accelerated growth of plants and manipulate the movement of most plant life. This ability manifests later in her life and thus she is less familiar with it.

Technically speaking, Jade is a meta-human. She was born with green-hued skin, dark green hair, green eyes and a star-shaped birthmark on her palm. Her skin contains chlorophyll (the source of its green hue), and she can photosynthesize sunlight as a plant does. Due to their shared mystical connection with the Starheart, Jade can sense where her twin brother and her father are. She once shared a telepathic connection with her brother.

As a member of the Green Lantern Corps, Jade wielded a power ring. Its power is not from the Starheart but from an aspect of the Emotional Spectrum. The power ring gave Jade abilities which were similar to her natural powers. It required recharging every 24 hours by her power battery. Jade's ring has a yellow impurity which required her to face her fears and overcome them with green willpower to master it. As a Black Lantern, Jade wielded a black power ring, but as a reanimated corpse she is not in control of her body or powers.

Other characters named Jade

Nicki Jones

In 52 Week 29, a young woman named Nicki Jones was introduced as a member of the new Lex Luthor-owned Infinity, Inc. under the superhero name Jade. Jones is a vegetarian graphic arts student from the San Francisco Art Institute. She possesses the ability to project glowing vines from her fingertips. She is also able to fly and use green energy powers. Jones debuted at a Thanksgiving parade, only to be attacked by Obsidian, who accused her of trying to steal his sister's legacy.

In 52 Week 40, the members of Infinity, Inc., with the exception of Jones, Natasha Irons, and Jacob Colby, battled Steel and the Teen Titans and were arrested. Jones appeared again during Week 50 in World War III with the remaining members of Infinity, Inc.

Other versions

Kingdom Come
In Alex Ross' miniseries Kingdom Come, an older Jade has taken the mantle of Green Lantern. In the end notes of the collectors' editions, she is identified as Green Lantern VI. Jade's efforts save her father, herself, and others when the United Nations drops a nuclear bomb during the climactic battle.

Tangent Comics
In Tangent Comics, the Earth-9 version of Jade is an Asian woman with the power to turn her tattoos into living dragons.

52
In the final issue of 52, a new Multiverse is revealed containing 52 parallel identical realities. One is designated "Earth-2". After Mister Mind eats elements of this reality, it resembles the Pre-Crisis Earth-Two. Although a character who is visually similar to the Jennie-Lynn Hayden incarnation of Jade and JSA members are present, they are not named in the panel in which they appear.

In November 2008, the authors discloses that Earth-2's Jade is alive but her father is dead. Jade is a member of Justice Society Infinity, formed through a merger of the Justice Society of America and Infinity, Inc.

Grant Morrison said this alternate universe is not the Pre-Crisis Earth-Two.

Manhunter
In the final arc of Manhunter, which takes place in the future, a new Jade appears who is the daughter of Obsidian. This version of Jade is an Asian teenager named after her aunt. She has light-based powers and is an active superhero.

Ame-Comi Girls
In the Ame-Comi universe, Jennifer is re-imagined as Jade Yifei, a teenager from Beijing, China. She is the daughter of a National People's Congress official. Despite being blinded in an accident as a child, she goes on become a well-known mountain climber. During an attack upon her family, she is chosen by a Green Lantern power ring, which greatly enhances her hearing. This allows her to "see" via a set of special headphones, as well as granting her the ability to create energy constructs and changing her skin color to green. Though she possesses the green skin of her original counterpart, the Ame-Comi version of Jade uses a power ring rather than an internal source of energy.

Convergence
During the DC crossover event Convergence, Jade, reminiscent of her Earth-2 counterpart, and her teammates at Infinity Inc. were trapped on Telos with a variety of other heroes from Earth-2. Depowered, she and her team went on with their lives with Jade returning to her life as an actress. When Telos put the various Earths against each other, Jade once again regained her powers. At the end of the story, she and her teammates returned to a new version of Earth-2.

In other media

Television
Jennie-Lynn Hayden appears in the DC Universe / The CW series Stargirl, portrayed by Ysa Penarejo. She breaks into Courtney Whitmore's home to retrieve Alan Scott's lantern, only to be attacked by Courtney. After Jennie introduces herself to Courtney and the latter's family, Courtney becomes skeptical of Jennie's intentions, believing she is a mole for the Injustice Society. As Pat Dugan trains Jennie to control her powers, which initially appear to be connected to Scott's lantern, Courtney eventually apologizes. After feeling isolated and emotional over her missing brother Todd Rice, Jennie breaks the lantern and strengthens her powers, after which Dugan theorizes Jennie herself is the source. Following this, Jennie leaves to find Rice, though Courtney and Dugan later recruit her to help them fight Eclipso. In season three, Jennie received Sandy Hawkins' help in finding Rice and helps him control his powers after discovering they were connected to hers.

Video games
Jade appears as a summonable character in Scribblenauts Unmasked: A DC Comics Adventure.

Miscellaneous
 Jade appeared in issue #20 of the DC Animated Universe tie-in comic Justice League Adventures.
 Jade appeared in Legion of Super Heroes in the 31st Century #6 as a member of the Green Lantern Corps.

Notes

References

External links
Chronological List of Appearances
Unofficial Jade (Jennie-Lynn Hayden) profile

Characters created by Geoff Johns
Characters created by Grant Morrison
Characters created by Greg Rucka
Characters created by Jerry Ordway
Characters created by Keith Giffen
Characters created by Mark Waid
Characters created by Roy Thomas
Comics characters introduced in 1983
Comics characters introduced in 2006
DC Comics American superheroes
DC Comics female superheroes
DC Comics metahumans
DC Comics characters who have mental powers
DC Comics telepaths
Earth-Two
Fictional artists
Fictional avatars
Fictional characters from Milwaukee
Fictional characters who can manipulate light
Fictional characters with energy-manipulation abilities
Fictional characters with plant abilities
Fictional models
Fictional photographers
Twin characters in comics
Green Lantern Corps officers
Superheroes who are adopted
Chinese superheroes